Ernesto Abaterusso (18 February 1956 – 17 November 2022) was an Italian politician. A member of the Democratic Party of the Left, the Democrats of the Left, the Democratic Party, and Article One, he served in the Chamber of Deputies from 1992 to 1994 and again from 1996 to 2001.

Abaterusso died on 17 November 2022, at the age of 66.

References

1956 births
2022 deaths
Italian Communist Party politicians
Democratic Party of the Left politicians
Democrats of the Left politicians
Democratic Party (Italy) politicians
Article One (political party) politicians
Deputies of Legislature XI of Italy
Deputies of Legislature XIII of Italy
University of Bologna alumni
People from the Province of Lecce